Kiss The Bunny was the second full-length album by Bickley, released in 1998 through by Fearless Records.  This album pushed Bickley from a regional punk rock success into national exposure.

Track listing
"Roommate 29"
"Calling All Punks"
"Two Ton Tessie"
"Fuckwall"
"Natalie"
"So Fucking Stupid"
"William Lester Brown III"
"Bert and Ernie"
"Say Something"
"You Getta Pettum"
"My Best Friends Girlfriend"
"Uncle Borloff"
"William Walks"
"The Abyss Sucks"
"She's My Beer"
"Punk Rock Girl"
"Bad Natalie"
"Legion of Beer"
"Dino"
"Prom Night"
"Passout"
"Rover Passed Away"
"Somebody's Gonna Get Their Head Kicked in Tonight"

Personnel 
 Ben Fondled - vocals
 Uncle Dig - guitar, vocals
 Bill Fool - bass
 Dave Wreckoning - drums
 Matte Finish - drums (on some tracks)
 Dan Workman - Producer

1998 albums
Bickley (band) albums
Fearless Records albums